David James Abbruzzese (born May 17, 1968) is an American musician who was the drummer for the American rock band Pearl Jam from 1991 to 1994. He replaced drummer Dave Krusen in 1991, shortly before the release of the band's debut album, Ten. Abbruzzese played on the band's following records, Vs. and Vitalogy.

Biography

Early life
Dave Abbruzzese was born in Stamford, Connecticut, and grew up in Mesquite, Texas, where he attended Vanston Jr. High. Abbruzzese grew up drumming on his dad's tackle boxes. While living at home the only thing in his bedroom (besides a bed) was his drum set. Abbruzzese dropped out of North Mesquite High School at an early age and began to focus on playing more than ever. He started playing in the Texas music scene, performing in such bands as Segueway, Flaming Hemorrhoids, and Course of Empire, and along the way, he formed a band called Dr. Tongue, a three-piece, funk-influenced band that gigged in the Dallas and Denton area.

Pearl Jam

In 1991, Abbruzzese got a call from drummer and friend Matt Chamberlain, whom Abbruzzese knew through the Texas music scene, in regard to filling in for him in the band Pearl Jam when he left. Chamberlain had his eyes set on G. E. Smith's band on Saturday Night Live. Abbruzzese left for Seattle, Washington to meet and become acquainted with the members of Pearl Jam. Although his musical tastes were far different from the other members, Abbruzzese chose to join Pearl Jam, playing his first show on August 23, 1991. Initially, Abbruzzese was reluctant to join the band full-time. Then after his second show with Pearl Jam, Abbruzzese went straight down to his local tattoo parlor and had bassist Jeff Ament's stick figure drawing from the sleeve of the "Alive" single tattooed onto his left shoulder. Abbruzzese joined the group and played the rest of Pearl Jam's live shows supporting the Ten album. Abbruzzese toured extensively for Ten and performed on MTV Unplugged and a Saturday Night Live appearance. Abbruzzese made his studio debut with Pearl Jam when the band released the single "Even Flow" in April 1992. They re-recorded the song for its single release with Abbruzzese on drums instead of original drummer Dave Krusen. Two songs for the Singles Soundtrack and the b-side "Dirty Frank" also came from the same recording session. The band found itself amidst the sudden popularity and attention given to the Seattle music scene and the genre known as grunge.

With Abbruzzese, the band recorded its second studio album, Vs., released in 1993. Upon its release, Vs. set at the time the record for most copies of an album sold in a week, and spent five weeks at number one on the Billboard 200. Vs. was nominated for a Grammy Award for Best Rock Album in 1995. From Vs., the song "Daughter" received a Grammy nomination for Best Rock Performance by a Duo or Group with Vocal and the song "Go" received a Grammy nomination for Best Hard Rock Performance. Abbruzzese toured extensively for Vs. and performed on a Saturday Night Live appearance. Abbruzzese wrote the music for the Pearl Jam songs "Go", "Last Exit" and "Angel" (from the 1993 fan club Christmas single). He played with Pearl Jam through April 17, 1994. In 1994, the band began a much-publicized boycott of Ticketmaster. Although Abbruzzese performed on the band's third studio album, Vitalogy, he was fired in August 1994 due to personality conflicts with the band members, four months before the album was released. Ament stated, "Dave was a different egg for sure. There were a lot of things, personality wise, where I didn't see eye to eye with him. He was more comfortable being a rock star than the rest of us. Partying, girls, cars. I don't know if anyone was in the same space." Guitarist Stone Gossard said, "It was the nature of how the politics worked in our band: It was up to me to say, 'Hey, we tried, it's not working; time to move on.' On a superficial level, it was a political struggle: For whatever reason his ability to communicate with Ed and Jeff was very stifled. I certainly don't think it was all Dave Abbruzzese's fault that it was stifled." Abbruzzese stated, "I didn't really agree with what was going on. I didn't agree with the Ticketmaster stuff at all. But I don't blame anyone or harbor any hard feelings. I'd be lying if I said I wasn't furious and hurt for a long time. But now I just wish there was more music from the band I was a part of."

On October 18, 2016, Pearl Jam was named among the 2017 class of nominees for induction in the Rock and Roll Hall of Fame.  In a departure from the protocol of previous years, the Hall named which specific former members would be inducted from each nominated band.  The only former member of Pearl Jam to be included was Dave Krusen.  Reacting to the snub, Abbruzzese stated "The members of Pearl Jam have got to know what's the right thing to do. They can't justify ignoring my contributions. Like me or not. If there is still a part of that band that remembers how hard we worked, how much blood and how much sweat ... They will do the right thing."  He further stated "It’s just a fine opportunity to see what Pearl Jam has to say in response. Let’s see if they do the right thing. It’ll be interesting to see the spin that is put on it. That band and its management have never been ones to shy away when an injustice is done. Let’s see if they still have the courage to fight the good fight!"

Other musical projects
On September 30, 1997, Abbruzzese's newly formed band, the Green Romance Orchestra, released Play Parts I & V. The album saw Abbruzzese bring his own songs to the drawing board, as well as play the role of a producer. Play Parts I & V is a release of Free Association Records, which was formed by Abbruzzese in 1996. In 1997, Abbruzzese rehearsed with Axl Rose during the making of Guns N' Roses' 2008 album, Chinese Democracy. However, none of the material from the sessions ended up on the album.

Afterward, Abbruzzese worked with HairyApesBMX. He mixed, produced, and engineered the band's 2000 album, Out Demons. Abbruzzese also lent the band a hand behind his drum kit on its Midwestern tour. Abbruzzese drummed on the IMF tour with Jara Harris, Stevie Salas, and Bernard Fowler in early 2016. Abbruzzese has also collaborated with Shawn Smith of Brad and Satchel.  They released their song "Like the Child of The Water I Am" for online download on December 26, 2015 and stated that their collaboration is ongoing and more music would be released in 2016.

Dave Abbruzzese is also part of the Indian multi-city grunge outfit Pseutopia, featuring Laji George on Vocals, Shyam Narayan on Bass, and Mithun Raju (from Thaikkudam Bridge) on Guitars. His first track with Pseutopia was a tribute to Chris Cornell's track "Seasons" that was released on Youtube on December 18th, 2018. Since then Pseutopia has released their second track "Brother" on May 12, 2022.

Musical style and influences
Abbruzzese has cited John Bonham, Sly & the Family Stone, and the Red Hot Chili Peppers as influences. Abbruzzese's trademarks include heavy use of splash cymbals, the double-stroke roll, and a fast right foot. Abbruzzese refused to use two bass drums or a double-kick pedal, instead concentrating on playing the best he could with a single pedal. Abbruzzese is also known to be a particularly hard hitter, which may be reflected in him having suffered from carpal tunnel syndrome at one time.

Equipment
On his earlier, pre-Vs. Pearl Jam recordings, such as the tracks recorded for Singles: Original Motion Picture Soundtrack and the video version of "Even Flow", Abbruzzese is known to have used Ludwig drums. As of the Vs. record, he endorsed and used Drum Workshop drums, Sabian cymbals, and seemed to favor an 8x12 Brady snare drum. Abbruzzese also had his own line of signature drumsticks, manufactured and marketed by Pro-Mark, but the model bearing his name appears to have been discontinued.

Personal life
Abbruzzese married Laura Whisman, on September 2, 2006; they later separated. He currently lives in Mesquite, TX. Abbruzzese has a daughter, Francesca, from a previous relationship.

Discography

Pearl Jam discography

Green Romance Orchestra discography

Contributions and collaborations

References

External links
 Dave Abbruzzese at Drummerworld
 

1968 births
American alternative rock drummers
Living people
Pearl Jam members
Musicians from Stamford, Connecticut
Grunge musicians
20th-century American drummers
American male drummers
21st-century American drummers
American male songwriters
20th-century American guitarists
21st-century American guitarists
American rock songwriters
American male guitarists